Barry Edward Beckett (February 4, 1943 – June 10, 2009) was an American keyboardist, session musician, record producer, and studio founder.  He is best known for his work with David Hood, Jimmy Johnson, and Roger Hawkins, his bandmates in the Muscle Shoals Rhythm Section, which  performed with numerous notable artists on their studio albums and helped define the "Muscle Shoals sound".

Among the artists Beckett recorded with were Bob Dylan, Boz Scaggs, Paul Simon, Rod Stewart, Duane Allman,  Lynyrd Skynyrd, Southside Johnny and the Asbury Jukes, Dire Straits, The Proclaimers and Phish. He was also briefly a member of the band Traffic.

Biography
Born in Birmingham, Alabama, Beckett rose to prominence as a member of the rhythm section at the Sheffield, Alabama-based Muscle Shoals studio, of which he was one of the founders in 1969. As a founding member of the Muscle Shoals Rhythm Section (also known as the Swampers), he helped define what became known as the Muscle Shoals sound.  In addition, the studio produced such chart-making hits as "Torn Between Two Lovers" by Mary MacGregor and the Sanford-Townsend Band's "Smoke from a Distant Fire".

In 1973, Beckett took to the road in the expanded lineup of Traffic; recordings from this tour were released on the band's live album On the Road.

Beckett was co-producing with Jerry Wexler when, in 1979, Bob Dylan called on Wexler to produce the sessions for the album Slow Train Coming.  Beckett not only co-produced the album but played piano and organ throughout. (He did not go on the road as a gospel tours musician behind Dylan, but he was back in the studio with him in February 1980 to co-produce, again with Wexler, the album Saved, on which he was replaced on keyboards by Spooner Oldham and Terry Young after the session of February 12, 1980, and so plays only on the album’s title track, "Solid Rock", "What Can I Do for You?" and "Satisfied Mind". On the album liner notes Beckett is billed as co-producer and as "special guest artist".

Beckett moved to Nashville in 1982 to become A & R country music director for Warner Bros. Records and co-produced Williams, Jr.'s records with Jim Ed Norman.  Beckett produced records independently after leaving Warner Bros. Records.

He also played on Paul Simon's albums There Goes Rhymin' Simon and Still Crazy After All These Years, which reached number 1 on the Billboard 200 pop chart.Beckett died from complications of a stroke at his home in Hendersonville, Tennessee, aged 66.

Awards and honors
 In 1995, Beckett was inducted into the Alabama Music Hall of Fame as a member of the Muscle Shoals Rhythm Section.

 Collaborations 
With Solomon Burke
 Proud Mary (Ola, 1969)

With Etta James
 Tell Mama (Cadet Records, 1968)
 Seven Year Itch (Island Records, 1988)
 Stickin' to My Guns (Island Records, 1990)
 Love's Been Rough on Me (Private Music, 1997)

With Bob Seger
 Back in '72 (Reprise Records, 1973)
 Beautiful Loser (Capitol Records, 1975)
 Night Moves (Capitol Records, 1976)
 Stranger in Town (Capitol Records, 1978)
 Against the Wind (Capitol Records, 1980)
 The Distance (Capitol Records, 1982)
 The Fire Inside (Capitol Records, 1991)

With Joan Baez
 Honest Lullaby (Portrait Records, 1979)

With Willie Nelson
 Phases and Stages (Atlantic Records, 1974)

With Feargal Sharkey
 Songs from the Mardi Gras (Virgin Records, 1991)

With William Bell
 Wow... (Stax Records, 1971)
 Phases of Reality (Stax Records, 1972)

With Julian Lennon
 Valotte (Atlantic Records, 1984)

With Cher
 3614 Jackson Highway (Atco Records, 1969)

With Vince Gill
 When I Call Your Name (MCA Records, 1989)
 Pocket Full of Gold (MCA Records, 1991)
 When Love Finds You (MCA Records, 1994)

With Kim Carnes
 Sailin' (A&M Records, 1976)

With Boz Scaggs
 Boz Scaggs (Atlantic Records, 1969)
 My Time (Columbia Records, 1972)
 Some Change (Virgin Records, 1994)

With Mary MacGregor
 Torn Between Two Lovers (Ariola Records, 1976)

With Mark Knopfler
 Golden Heart (Vertigo Records, 1996)

With John P. Hammond
 Southern Fried (Atlantic Records, 1971)

With Mavis Staples
 Mavis Staples (Volt Records, 1969)
 Only for the Lonely (Volt Records, 1970)
 Oh What a Feeling (Warner Bros. Records, 1979)

With Wilson Pickett
 Hey Jude (Atlantic Records, 1969)
 Right On (Atlantic Records, 1970)
 Don't Knock My Love (Atlantic Records, 1971)

With Paul Anka
 Feelings (United Artists Records, 1975)

With John Michael Montgomery
 What I Do the Best (Atlantic Records, 1996)

With Steve Cropper
 Night After Night (MCA Records, 1982)

With Eddie Rabbitt
 Loveline (Elektra Records, 1979)

With Dee Dee Bridgewater
 Dee Dee Bridgewater (Atlantic Records, 1976)

With Albert King
 Lovejoy (Stax Records, 1971)

With Paul Simon
 There Goes Rhymin' Simon (Columbia Records, 1973)
 Still Crazy After All These Years (Columbia Records, 1975)

With Wendy Waldman
 Gypsy Symphony (Warner Bros. Records, 1974)

With Wynonna Judd
 Wynonna (Curb Records, 1992)
 Tell Me Why (Curb Records, 1993)

With Levon Helm
 Levon Helm (ABC Records, 1978)
 Levon Helm (Capitol Records, 1982)

With Trace Adkins
 Dreamin' Out Loud (Capitol Records, 1996)

With Aretha Franklin
 This Girl's in Love with You (Atlantic Records, 1970)
 Spirit in the Dark (Atlantic Records, 1970)

With Candi Staton
 Candi (Warner Bros. Records, 1974)
 His Hands (Honest Records, 2006)

With Donovan
 Lady of the Stars (RCA Records, 1984)

With Dolly Parton
 White Limozeen (Columbia Records, 1989)

With John Prine
 Storm Windows (Asylum Records, 1980)

With Aaron Neville
 The Tattoeed Heart (A&M Records, 1995)

With Kenny Chesney
 All I Need to Know (BNA Records, 1995)
 Me and You (BNA, 1996)

With Joe Cocker
 Luxury You Can Afford (Asylum Records, 1978)

With Ronnie Hawkins
 Ronnie Hawkins (Cotillion Records, 1970)

With Lulu
 New Routes (Atlantic Records, 1970)

With Beth Nielsen Chapman
 Hearing It First (Capitol Records, 1980)

With Dion DiMucci
 Velvet and Steel (Epic Records, 1986)

With Ilse DeLange
 World of Hurt (Warner Bros. Records, 1998)

With Dion DiMucci
 Velvet and Steel (DaySpring Records, 1987)

With Chely Wright
 Woman in the Moon (Mercury Records, 1994)

With Odetta
 Odetta Sings (Polydor Records, 1970)

With Laura Nyro
 Christmas and the Beads of Sweat (Columbia Records, 1970)

With Johnny Rivers
 The Road (Atlantic Records, 1974)

With Bob Dylan
 Slow Train Coming (Columbia Records, 1979)
 Saved (Columbia Records, 1980)

With Peabo Bryson
 Peabo (Bullet Records, 1976)

With Ricky Van Shelton
 A Bridge I Didn't Burn (Columbia Records, 1993)

With J. J. Cale
 Really (A&M Records, 1972)

With Art Garfunkel
 Breakaway (Columbia Records, 1975)
 Watermark (Columbia Records, 1977)

With Rosanne Cash
 King's Record Shop (Columbia Records, 1987)

With Michael Martin Murphey
 Tonight We Ride (Warner Bros. Records, 1986)

With José Feliciano 
 Sweet Soul Music (Private Stock Records, 1976)

With Cat Stevens
 Izitso (A&M Records, 1977)

With Leon Russell
 Leon Russell and the Shelter People (Shelter Records, 1971)

With Rod Stewart
 Atlantic Crossing (Warner Bros. Records, 1975)
 A Night on the Town (Warner Bros. Records, 1976)

With Glenn Frey
 The Allnighter (MCA Records, 1984)
 Soul Searchin' (MCA Records, 1988)

With Linda Ronstadt
 Linda Ronstadt (Capitol Records, 1971)

With Rodney Crowell
 Diamonds & Dirt (Columbia Records, 1988)
 Keys to the Highway (Columbia Records, 1989)
 Life Is Messy (Columbia Records, 1992)

With John P. HammondSo Many Roads'' (Vanguard Records, 1965)

References

External links

1943 births
2009 deaths
American rock keyboardists
American rock pianists
American male pianists
American soul keyboardists
American male organists
American rhythm and blues keyboardists
Rhythm and blues pianists
Ramsay High School alumni
Record producers from Alabama
Muscle Shoals Rhythm Section members
Musicians from Birmingham, Alabama
20th-century American keyboardists
American session musicians
20th-century organists
20th-century American male musicians
20th-century American pianists
American organists